Alleppey Vincent was an Indian actor in Malayalam cinema. He acted in Balan (1938), the first talkie made in Malayalam. He is the brother of Sebastian Kunjukunju Bhagavathar.

Biography
Vincent was born to Pollayil Vincent and Margarita as the youngest child, in Ambalappuzha taluk of Alappuzha district in the Indian state of Kerala. He is the younger brother of Sebastian Kunjukunju Bhagavathar. Both of them had associated with the initial stages of Malayalam cinema. He acted in the first talkie ever made in Malayalam Balan in 1938, as character Shanku.  When the proposed heroine, Kunjamma, of the movie Balan eloped with Sundaram Pillai the assistant director of the movie, he brought the new heroine M. K. Kamalam who was then working as a drama artist at Sebastian Kunjukunju Bhagavathar drama troupe and introduced her to director of Balan. Vincent was the first person to record his voice in a Malayalam cinema. His words were first recorded words. He uttered the word 'Good Luck everyone' and it gained him  name as first speaking person of Malayalam cinema. In the second Malayalam  talkie 'Jnanambika' both Alleppey Vincent and Sebastian Kunjukunju Bhagavathar acted. Vincent acted in the film 'Oral Koody Kallanayi' in 1964 with Prem Nazir, S. P. Pillai, T. S. Muthaiah and in 1974 for the film 'Kamini' with Raghavan, Rani Chandra, Kuthiravattam Pappu, Bahadoor etc.
Alleppey Vincent was lucky to act with M. G. R. in the Malayalam film 'Genova' in the year
1953. It is the only Malayalam film M. G. R. ever acted.

He together with late T. V. Thomas, Communist leader and minister in the first EMS ministry, had started a film production company, Udaya Pictures, which Kunchacko took over and renamed as Udaya Studio. Vincent even acted in the first film that rolled out from here, Vellinakshtram.  They also worked behind Ajantha Studio, Aluva. Vincent was first president of The Kerala Cooperative Cine Society Limited, Alwaye. Sebastian Paul, former Member of Parliament, who has written a biography of him titled Alleppey Vincent: Malayala Cinemayude Snapakan. Vincent was having his own drama troupe based at Alapuzha and have presented
several successful plays for a long period.

Filmography
 Balan (1938)
 Gnanambika (1940)
 Vellinakshathram (1949)
 Jenova (1953)
 Oraal Koodi Kallanaayi (1964)
 Periyar (1973)
 Kaamini (1974)
 Aarorumariyaathe (1984)

References

External links

 Alleppey Vincent at MSI

Male actors from Kerala
Male actors in Malayalam cinema
Indian male film actors
Malayalam playback singers
Living people
Year of birth missing (living people)
20th-century Indian male actors
People from Alappuzha district